Motley is a census-designated place (CDP) in Pittsylvania County, Virginia, United States. It was named for a notable Virginia family in colonial times, the Motleys. Two of them, Joseph and his son David James Motley, fought in the American Revolution. The population as of the 2010 Census was 1,015.

References
Virginia Trend Report 2: State and Complete Places (Sub-state 2010 Census Data)

Unincorporated communities in Virginia
Census-designated places in Pittsylvania County, Virginia
Census-designated places in Virginia